Timeship is a role-playing game published by Yaquinto Publications in 1983.

Description
Timeship is a time-travel role-playing system with very general rules. Unlike other roleplaying games where the players create fictional characters, in Timeship, players role-play themselves as they are teleported by a powerful ritual in an ancient scroll into the past or the future. At a time when game systems were becoming increasingly complex, Timeship was an attempt to simplify and streamline the rules.

Game components include a rulebook, a GM's screen, percentile dice, and a pad of character record sheets. 

The rulebook includes three scenarios.
"Murder at the End of Time": The players encounter simulacra of Dracula and Little Red Riding Hood
"Destruction of Gomorrah": The players are transported to Gomorrah, where they free slaves and sacrificial victims and try to deactivate the device that will destroy the city 
"Assassinate the Fuhrer.": The players are transported to Berlin in April 1945, and must locate the Führerbunker where Adolf Hitler is hiding and ensure his demise.

Publication history
Timeship, the last roleplaying game published by Yaquinto Publications, was designed by Herbie Brennan, with art by Johnny Robinson.

Reception
In the December 1983 edition of Dragon (Issue 80), Ken Rolston was guardedly enthusiastic about Timeship. Roslton admired the simplification of the rules system, and the ambitious nature of a game that attempted to cover all of past and future time. However, he sometimes found the humorous tone in the rulebook "is often irritatingly cute and self-indulgent, and the rules of play themselves are difficult to read and reference because of the idiosyncratic style." Rolston thought the first scenario, "Murder at the End of Time", to be "pretty silly", but found the third scenario set in wartime Berlin to be "the most detailed and credible", although he faulted writer Herbie Brennan for not including a bibliography of references about wartime Berlin that a gamesmaster could use to flesh out the scant details provided. Rolston concluded by recommending the game, saying, "First, it is a distinctive example of simpler, rather than more complex, FRP game mechanics. Second, the central idea of the game, time travel, is marvelously fertile soil for FRP gaming, and this is the first game to attempt to cultivate it. Finally, I believe this game may be more accessible to those not already addicted to games." 

In the August 1984 edition of Space Gamer (Issue No. 70) William A. Barton found the rules badly organized, and not enough historical material included. "As much as I enjoy time travel and would like to role-play such journeys into the past and future, I can hardly recommend Timeship. Unless you're prepared to do a lot of work rewriting and making up rules, you're best off waiting for someone else to take a shot at a time travel RPG."

Nearly a decade after the publication of Timeship, Lawrence Schick, in his 1991 retrospective book Heroic Worlds: A History and Guide to Role-Playing Games, called the game an "attempt to cover every historical possibility with maximum flexibility – an ambitious goal that is not quite achieved".

Review
 Different Worlds #33 (March/April, 1984)

References

Role-playing games introduced in 1983
Time travel and multiple reality role-playing games
Yaquinto Publications games